The 2020–21 Newcastle Jets W-League season will be their thirteenth season in the W-League, the premier competition for women's football in Australia.

W-League

League table

References

External links
 Official Website

Newcastle Jets FC (A-League Women) seasons
2020–21 W-League (Australia) by team